Khao Kho Non-hunting Area is a non-hunting area in Khao Kho District of Phetchabun Province.

Geography
Streams flow into Wang Thong River a tributary of the Nan River.

Topography
The total mountain area is 74%, of which 20% in the east (Khao Khat) and northeast (Khao Kho) high slope mountain area (upper-slopes, shallow valleys, mountain tops and deeply incised streams) and 54% hill slope area (open slopes, u-shaped valleys and midslope ridges). Plains count for 26%.

Flora
The non-hunting area features dry evergreen forest (83%), agricultural area (15%), and abandoned farms (2%).

Fauna
Mammals, there are 20 species from 16 families, represented by one species:

Birds, there are some 24 species, of which 12 species of passerine from 10 families, represented by one species:

and 12 species of non-passerine from 12 families, represented by one species:

Reptiles

Location

See also
 List of protected areas of Thailand
List of Protected Areas Regional Offices of Thailand

References

Non-hunting areas of Thailand
Geography of Phetchabun province
Tourist attractions in Phetchabun province
1986 establishments in Thailand
Protected areas established in 1986